Iberia Airport  is an airport serving Iberia in the Madre de Dios Region of Peru. The town is in the Amazon basin,  from the Peruvian border with Bolivia.

See also
List of airports in Peru
Transport in Peru

References

External links
 Airports infrastructurePeruvian Ministry of Infrastructure and Communications
OurAirports - Iberia
OpenStreetMap - Iberia

Airports in Peru
Buildings and structures in Madre de Dios Region